Elie is a masculine given name. Notable people with the name include:

First name

A–G
Elie Abadie (born 1960), Rabbi in the United Arab Emirates
Elie Abel (1920–2004), Canadian journalist
Elie Adda (1892–1975), Egyptian fencer
Elie Aghnides (1901–1988), Greek engineer and inventor,
Elie Aiboy (born 1979), Indonesian football player
Elie Apper (born 1933), Belgian saxophonist 
Elie Azagury (1918–2009), Moroccan architect
Elie Bouka (born 1992), Canadian football player
Elie Brun (born 1948), French politician
Elie Buconyori, Burundi bishop
Elie Bursztein (born 1980) French computer scientist and engineer
Elie Carafoli (1901–1983), Romanian engineer
Elie Che (1998–2020), English model, performer, and trans activist
Elie Aron Cohen (1909–1993), Dutch doctor
Elie Cristo-Loveanu (1893–1964), Romanian artist
Elie Fahed (born 1989), Lebanese filmmaker
Elie Farah (1909–2003), Lebanese archbishop
Elie Ferzli (born 1949), Lebanese politician
Elie Guillemer (1904–1987), French cyclist

H–N
Elie Hervier (1896–1987), French sculptor
Elie Hirschfeld (born 1949), American businessman
Elie Hobeika (1956–2002), Lebanese military leader
Elie Honig, American attorney
Elie Horn (born 1944), Brazilian businessman
Elie Ikangu (born 1986), French football player
Elie Katz (born 1974), American politician and businessman
Elie Kaunfer (born 1973), American rabbi 
Elie Kayrouz (born 1959), Lebanese politician 
Elie Kedourie (1926–1992), British historian
Elie Konki (born 1992), French boxer 
Elie Lainé (1829–1911), French landscape architect
Elie Martel (born 1934), Canadian politician
Elie Mechantaf (born 1970), Lebanese basketball player
Elie Melia (1915–1988), Georgian priest and historian
Elie Mitri (born 1980), Lebanese actor
Elie Naasan (1931–2015), Lebanese wrestler
Elie Nadelman (1882–1946), American sculptor
Elie Nakouzi (born 1969), Lebanese television presenter 
Elie Ngoyi (born 1988), Canadian football player
Elie Norbert (born 1984), Malagasy judoka

O–Z
Elie Ofek, Israeli-American economist
Elie Radu (1853–1931), Romanian civil engineer and academic
Elie Rajaonarison (1951–2010), Malagasy poet
Elie Rekhess (born 1945), Israeli historian
Elie Rustom (born 1987), Lebanese basketball player 
Elie Saab (born 1964), Lebanese fashion designer
Elie Salem (born 1930), Lebanese academic and politician
Elie Samaha (born 1955), Lebanese-born American film producer
Elie Seckbach, American sports journalist
Elie A. Shneour (1925–2015), French-born American scientist and author
Elie Siegmeister (1909–1991), American composer and author
Elie Solier (1914–1984), Caledonian lawyer and politician
Elie Stephan (born 1981), Lebanese basketball player
Elie Susman (1880–1957), South African businessman
Elie Tahari (born 1952), Israeli fashion designer 
Elie Track, American physicist
Elie Wiesel (1928–2016), Romanian-born American writer and Nobel laureate
Elie A. F. La Vallette (1790–1862), American admiral

Middle name
Charles-Elie Laprévotte (born 1992), French football player
Laurent Elie Badessi (born 1964), French photographer and artist

See also
 Élie, French version
 Elie (surname)
 Elie (disambiguation)

Masculine given names
Hebrew masculine given names